The 2017–18 Tahiti Ligue 1 is the 71st season of top-flight football in Tahiti. Tefana are the defending champions having won their fifth title last season. The season started on 15 September 2017 and finished on 19 May 2018.

Standings

Top scorers

Hat-tricks
It was the record season with 52 hat-tricks.

 4 Player scored 4 goals
 5 Player scored 5 goals
 6 Player scored 6 goals
 7 Player scored 7 goals

See also
2017–18 Tahiti Cup

References

Tahiti Ligue 1 seasons
Tahiti
Tahiti
Ligue 1
Ligue 1